Parchís was a children's music group from Spain which enjoyed great success in the Spanish-speaking world in the 1980s. Their significance in Hispanic popular culture comes from being perceived as an archetype of this type of band at the time. Parchís' original five members were Constantino Fernández Fernández (the red pawn), Yolanda Ventura Román (the yellow pawn), Oscar Ferrer Cañadas (the blue pawn), Gemma Prat Termens (the green pawn), and David Muñoz Forcada (the rolling die, which is singular for dice). After several line-up changes, the group disbanded in 1985 with various members continuing successful careers in the world of entertainment.

The group's name is a reference to the board game parchís (an adaptation of pachisi), where each player represents a different colored pawn (red, yellow, blue, and green). In the same way, each member of the group dressed in one of these four colors with the fifth member representing the dice.

History

Parchís was created in 1979, after executives from the Belter Records company placed a newspaper ad in Barcelona, asking children to attend auditions to form a musical group. At first, Belter Records intended to employ the group members during summers only; the company's executives figured out that would be the best season of the year for Parchís albums and concerts to sell.

Parchís was neither a boy or girl band. Eventually, the band expanded to have six members at the same time. Gemma Prat Termens, David Muñoz Forcada, Oscar Ferrer Cañadas, Constantino Fernández Fernández (better known as Tino), and Yolanda Ventura (daughter of the well-known trumpet player, Rudy Ventura) were the first five kids to be chosen as members of Parchís.

Tino was the heartthrob of the group; Gemma was the shy one; Yolanda was every boy's crush; Frank, who joined in 1981 after Oscar left, was the extroverted redhead; and David, a blonde-haired boy, was the best dancer and the life of the party.

Parchís' first single, "En La Armada", was a Spanish version of the Village People's disco hit, "In the Navy". "En La Armada" became a major hit in Spain, giving way for a number of important music composers to start working with Parchís. "En La Armada" was followed by what was arguably the group's biggest hit, "Durante la Espera de Parchís" ("During Parchís' Wait"). This song became a number one hit in Mexico. Later on, the group also became successful in Argentina, Colombia, Ecuador and other American countries.

Personal problems forced Oscar Ferrer Caňadas out of the band in 1981. He was substituted by Francisco Díaz Terez, known by fans simply as "Frank". Brothers Miguel Ángel Gómez Cambronero (born in Germany) and Jesús Gómez Cambronero joined the band after Tino and David left the group in 1983.

Losing Tino proved lethal to the group, however. With Menudo reaching unprecedented (for a Hispanic children's music group) success levels in Latin America as well as in Spain, and other Latin American groups like Los Chamos and Los Chicos also providing Parchís with the competition, and with Ferrer Cañadas' considerable number of fans going, Parchís began to wane.

In Spain, however, the group remained popular enough to release a 1983 movie, Parchís Entra en Acción (translated as Parchís Gets Into Action in English), alongside Alberto Fernández de Rosa.

In 1985, Parchís broke up. The group had recorded a number of albums that were successful in Spain and Latin America. More than a decade later, the group would reunite for one television show engagement.

On February 10, 2008, Parchís made an appearance on the Mexican television show "Muévete". It was the first time in 25 years that they were all together on the same stage. They were introduced and sang the song "Parchís" with everyone in attendance. Tino spoke of a comeback and wanting to sing again. They were interviewed for about one hour and spoke about their romances and adventures during their tour. They announced plans to tour again and come out with a new album. In the opening sequence, they all stood on a colored circle and the curtains came up, but there was a problem with Gemma's circled curtain that didn't come up in time, but she continued to sing. This was the highest viewed program in Mexico for the year so far.

Members 

 Constantino "Tino" Fernández Fernández (born March 25, 1967, in Barcelona, Spain; Member from 1979 to 1983), the red pawn, lead vocalist, and leader of the group. He began a solo career after his time in the group, releasing three albums with little success. He later worked for Artel. During this time, he lost his left arm in a car accident in Murcia. He is currently working as a radio sports commentator in Barcelona and is married with no children.
 Yolanda Ventura (born October 21, 1968, in Barcelona, Spain; Member from 1979 to 1985), the yellow pawn, and daughter of Spanish musician Rudy Ventura. After Parchís, Yolanda began acting in television shows in Spain, before relocating to Mexico where she works exclusively for Televisa. She had a son with her first husband, actor Alejandro Aragon, and is now in a relationship with Odiseo Bichir, another actor.
 Gemma Prat Termens (born October 22, 1968, in Barcelona, Spain; member from 1979 to 1985), the green pawn. She went on to run a kindergarten in Barcelona. She is now working as a clerk and is married with a daughter.
 David Muñoz Forcada (born March 23, 1970, in Barcelona, Spain; member from 1979 to 1984), the white die, and the group's dancer. After Parchís, he went to Scotland to study economics and currently works for an advertisement company. He is married and lives in the United States.
 Óscar Ferrer Cañadas (born November 20, 1971, in Barcelona, Spain; member from 1979 to 1981), the blue pawn, and the first band member to leave. He subsequently graduated with a degree in journalism and political science, and now works as a marketing manager in a communication group. He is married.
 Francisco "Frank" Díaz Terez (born August 6, 1971, in Barcelona, Spain; member from 1981 to 1985), Oscar's replacement as the blue pawn. Frank already had experience as an advertising model before joining the group. He formed a rock band after leaving Parchís, and is now an entrepreneur, with a wife and daughter.
 Jesús "Chus" Gómez Cambronero (born May 14, 1969, in Madrid, Spain; member from 1983 to 1985), the red pawn, and Tino's replacement as the group's leader. After Parchís, he formed a band called Platón (duet) with his brother Michel.
 Miguel "Michel" Ángel Gómez Cambronero (born September 8, 1966, in Hamburg, Germany; member from 1984 to 1985), the white die, David's replacement, and the last new member to join. After Parchís, he and his brother Chus formed the group Platón in 1992.

Discography

Album 1 : "Las Super 25 Canciones de Los Peques" (España - 1979) 
 Superman
 Barbapapa Rock
 Fantasmas a Go-Go
 Gloria
 La Plaga
 Demasiado Cielo
 Si Vas a París Papa
 Cantando Aventuras
 Los Cinco
 En La Armada
 Mi Barba
 Hallelujah
 El Plátano
 Ganador
 Me Gustas Mucho
 Si Tuviera Un Martillo
 Mamá Yo Quiero
 Mortadelo y Filemón
 La Canción de... Parchís
 Tarzan
 De Oca, En Oca
 Es Tan Divertido Ayudar a Papá
 Hooray! Hooray!
 La de la Mochila Azul
 Ven a Mi Casa Esta Navidad

Album 2 : "Comando G" (España - 1980)
 Comando G (3)
 Me Vuelvo Loco (3)
 El Video Mató a La Estrella de la Radio (3)
 Vamos a Bailar (3)
 Animales, Animales, Animales
 Ali Baba (3)
 Un Mundo Para Ellos
 Zark -7 (3)
 Una Casita en Canada (3) (8)
 Animales (8)	
 Songs from the anime series "Battle of the Planets" (Science Ninja Team Gatchaman) by Tatsunoko Production
 
Album 3 : "La Batalla de Los Planetas" (España - 1980) (Cassette only) 
 La Batalla de Los Planetas (4) (8)
 Me Vuelvo Loco
 Zark-7
 Una Casita en Canadá
 Defensores Del Bien
 Comando G
 El Vídeo Mató a la Estrella de la Radio
 Por El Deporte a la Paz	
 Alí Babá

Album 4 : "Twist Del Colegio" (España - 1980)
 Twist Del Colegio (5)
 Viejo Tren
 Ratatata (8)
 Funkytown
 Toc-Toc-Toc
 Tu Nombre (8)
 Don Diablo (8)
 La Caza Del Ratón
 Dime Que Me Quieres	
 Érase Una Vez El Hombre (Single - Argentina 1980)
 Cantando y a La Cama (LP “Parchís” -Argentina 1980)

Album 5 : "La Guerra de Los Niños" (España - 1980)
 Querido Professor
 Tema del Flaco (Instrumental)
 Fin de Curso
 Tema del Profesor (Instrumental)
 Comando G (Instrumental)
 Twist del Colegio
 Tema de Supermán (Instrumental)
 Ayúdale
 Tema de Don Atilio (Instrumental)
 Canción de Don Mati (Instrumental)

Album 6 : "Nadales" (España - 1980)
 Fum, Fum, Fum
 El Rabada
 Les Dotze Van Tocant
 El Desembre Congelat
 El Tunc Que Tan Tunc
 La Mare De Deu
 Noi de la Mare El
 Sant Josep I La Mare de Deu
 Cascavells
 Santa Nit
 L'avet
 El Demoni Escort

Album 7 : "Villancicos" (España - 1980)
 Campana Sobre Campana
 Los Peces en el Río
 Navidades Blancas
 Rin, Rin (16)
 Dime, Niño ¿De Quién Eres?
 Arre, Borriquito
 Noche de Paz
 ¡Ay! Del Chiquirritín
 Ande, Ande, Ande
 Jingle Bells
 El Pequeño Tamborilero
 Canta, Ríe y Bebe

Album 8 : "Parchís Contra el Inventor Invisible" (Argentina - 1981)
 La Magia Del Circo (9) (11)
 Hola Amigos  (9) (13)
 Cinco Amigos de Verdad (11) 
 Canta y Baila (9) (13) (B-SIDE  “Hola Amigos” (España - 1981)

Album 9 : "Corazon de Plomo" (España - 1981)
 Corazón de Plomo (11)
 Un Rayo de Sol
 Dime Por Qué
 Vamos a Bailar un Twist
 Me Vas a Volver Loco (12)
 El País de la Música (12)
 Rockabilly Rebel	
 Pequeño Amor en Buenos Aires (LP “La Super Discoteca” Argentina 1981)
 Veo Veo (Unreleased Song “Generación 2000/Grandes Éxitos Vol. 2/ Mexico 2001)

Album 10 : "Parchís y Sus Amigos" (España - 1981)
 El Espacio
 Cumpleaños Feliz (12) (13)
 Los Picapiedra
 El Baile Del Stop
 Que Barbaridad
 Tintarella Di Luna
 Vamos a Cantar (12)
 El Baile de Los Pajaritos (12)
 Ven a Mi Fiesta (12) (13)
 Verdad o Mentira
 Cuando Me Miras

ALBUM 11 : "La Segunda Guerra de Los Niños" (España - 1981)
 Otro Curso
 Mi Bici
 La Chica Ideal
 ¡Oh, Jesús!
 Querido Walt Disney (13)
 Nana Blanca, Nana Negra

Album 12 : "La Magia de Los Parchís" (Argentina - 1981)
 Parchís y El Mago
 Vamos Por Un Mundo De Colores
 Bocadillo Stop
 Patinbaile
 La Superfiesta
 El Árbol de la Sabiduría (LP “Los Parchís a Disneylandia”/ Argentina 1982)
 Himno de Las Aguilas Del America (SINGLE /México 1982)
 El Mundial (El Mundial 82 /España)

Album 13 : "Cumpleaños Feliz" (España - 1982)
 Márchate Ya  (14)
 Buenos Días Arco Iris (14)
 Hasta La Vista (14)
 Vamos a Río
 Meteorite Rock and Roll(14)

Album 14 : "Las Aventuras de los Parchís" (Argentina 1982)
 Tarzán, Tarzán
 Hasta Luego Cocodrilo (15)
 Pregúntale a Juan
 Pancho López
 Hay Que Vencer Al Miedo	
 La Batalla De Los Planetas (Popurri) Unreleased Medley “Todas sus canciones… todos sus éxitos (España 2005)
 Ya Estás Aquí (Maxi – single España 1982)
 Los Muchachos (Niños)

Album 15 : "Las Locuras de Parchís" (España - 1982)
 Arriba, Abajo
 El Ritmo Loco
 No Sé Porque
 Bien, Bien Bravo
 Las Rockeras de Santa Teresita
 Vuelvo de Disney World
 Safari en la Ciudad
 Las Locuras de Parchís
 Señor Búho
 Mi Super Superman
 Mi Guitarra
 Auxilio, Socorro
 Mi Amigo Pancho
 Felicidades (from the film “Las Locuras de Parchís”)

Album 16 : "Feliz Navidad" (España - 1982)
 Feliz Navidad (17)
 La Virgen y San José
 Pastores Venid
 Una Pandereta Suena
 La Noragüena
 Catatumba, Tumba, Tumba
 Ya Viene La Vieja
 Madre en la Puerta Hay un Niño
 Carrasclas
 Tan, Tan de los Reyes
 A Belen Pastorcitos
 Zúmbale al Pandero
 El Portal de Belen	
 Paquetitos Navideños (LP “15 Nuevos Villancicos “ / México - 1982)
 Esto es America (LP “Las Locuras de Parchís “ /México - 1983)
 Lucky, El Jinte Solitario (Unreleased Song  “Sus Grandes Exitos” /España – 1985)
 Scooby Doo (Unreleased Song  “Un Globo, Dos Globos, Tres Globos” /España – 2002)

Album 17 : "Super Discolandia" (España- 1983)
 Entra en Acción
 En el Super Mercado
 Vamos a Ganar
 A Entrenar
 A Vencer

Album 18 : "Siempre Parchís" (España - 1983)
 No Pongas el Cassette
 La Puerta Verde
 La Banda Está Loca
 Que Maravilla de Canción
 Tranqui Tranqui
 ¡Oh! Mamá, Papá
 Marionetas en la Cuerda
 Cosas de Críos
 24,000 Besos
 La Dolce Vita
 Yo También Quiero Fama
 Quiero Que LLegue El Domingo
 24,000 Besos (24 Mila Baci) (Version 2) LP “Tranqui, Tranqui” / México 1983)
 Fama (17)
 No Pongas el Cassette (VERSION 2)

Album 19 : "Que Tal Te Va" (España - 1984)
 Que Tal Te Va
 Una Moto Quiero Yo
 Ahora Sí
 La Timidez
 Tartamudeo
 Viva el Cinco
 Tal Para Cual
 No Me Mientas
 La Del Suéter Gris
 Suspenso Total
 Sábado, Sábado (LP “Que Tal Te  Va “/ México -1984)
 Me Estoy Volviendo Loco

Album 20 : "Decídete, Atrévete" (México - 1985)
 No Sé, No Sé
 La Colegiala
 Yo Soy Como Soy
 Lobo Hombre en París
 Dime Cual Fue la razon
 LLamas a Mi Puerta
 Decídete, Atrévete
 Nubes De Colores
 Joven Primer Amor
 Dissidia

References

Spanish musical groups
Children's music